"Little Sheila" is a song by the British rock band Slade, released in 1985 as the fourth and final single from the band's twelfth studio album Rogues Gallery. It was released in North America and Germany, and was the only single to be released from the album in America and Canada. The song was written by lead vocalist Noddy Holder and bassist Jim Lea, and produced by John Punter.

Background
Slade began recording their twelfth studio album Rogues Gallery in 1984. Although the singles "All Join Hands", "7 Year Bitch" and "Myzsterious Mizster Jones" had all preceded the album's release from late 1984 onwards, none of them were released by the band's American label CBS. Instead, they chose "Little Sheila" as the album's only single to be released in America and Canada.

Released in April 1985, "Little Sheila" received a good amount of radio play, but had little support from CBS beyond its music video. The single peaked at No. 86 on the Billboard Hot 100, but fared better on the Mainstream Rock Chart, where it reached No. 13. In Canada, it reached No. 50. It became Slade's last charting single in the United States and Canada.

"Little Sheila" dated from around 1979-80 when it recorded by Lea and his brother Frank as part of their music project The Dummies. This version of the song would not surface until 1992, when it was included on A Day in the Life of the Dummies, an album that gathered The Dummies' recordings.

Release
"Little Sheila" was released on 7" and 12" vinyl by CBS in America and Canada, and by RCA in Germany. The CBS release featured "Lock Up Your Daughters" as the B-side, which was taken from the band's 1981 album Till Deaf Do Us Part and also included on the CBS version of Rogues Gallery. In Germany, the Rogues Gallery album track "Time to Rock" was the B-side. For the German 12" vinyl, an extended version of "Little Sheila" was featured as the A-side.

Promotion
A music video was filmed to promote the single, which was directed by Nick Morris and produced by Scott Millaney and Fiona O'Mahoney. The video features the band performing the song as part of a stage play which follows the story of the titular character. For use in the video, guitarist Dave Hill borrowed his old trademark "Superyob" guitar from Adam and the Ants' guitarist Marco Pirroni. The video is broken down into five scenes:

 Act One - The Dark & Stormy Night
 Act Two - Alone in Dollars City
 Act Three - The Decline of Sheila
 Act Four - A Strange Encounter
 Act Five - Saved by the Law

The video received light rotation on MTV,
while in Germany, the band performed the song on the TV shows ExtraTour and Die Spielbude.

Critical reception
Upon release, Billboard listed the song under their "Recommended" section in the "Pop" category of single reviews. They said: "Proto-metallists are still bashing away, raucous and good-natured as ever." In an AllMusic review of the 2007 Salvo compilation The Collection 79-87, Dave Thompson said: "Songs like "Little Sheila" may veer a little closer to generic hard rock than Slade really ought to, but that was the sound of the '80s, just as the glam stomp was what powered their years of omnipotence."

Formats
7" Single (CBS release)
"Little Sheila" - 3:56
"Lock Up Your Daughters" - 3:28

7" Single (CBS promo release)
"Little Sheila" - 3:56
"Little Sheila" - 3:56

12" Single (CBS promo release)
"Little Sheila" - 3:56
"Little Sheila" - 3:56

7" Single (RCA Germany release)
"Little Sheila" - 3:54
"Time to Rock" - 4:08

12" Single (RCA Germany release)
"Little Sheila (Extended Version)" - 4:31
"Time to Rock" - 4:08

Chart performance

Personnel
Slade
Noddy Holder - lead vocals
Jim Lea - bass, synthesiser, backing vocals, producer of "Lock Up Your Daughters" and "Time to Rock", arranger
Dave Hill - lead guitar, backing vocals
Don Powell - drums

Additional personnel
John Punter - producer of "Little Sheila"
Image Bank - photography on RCA sleeve
Mainartery - sleeve design of RCA sleeve

References

1985 singles
1985 songs
Slade songs
CBS Records singles
RCA Records singles
Songs written by Noddy Holder
Songs written by Jim Lea
Song recordings produced by John Punter